Mohammed Riyadh Jasim Al-Khafaji (born 20 February 1994) is an Iraqi rower. He placed 21st in the men's single sculls event at the 2016 Summer Olympics.

References

External links
 

1994 births
Living people
Iraqi male rowers
Olympic rowers of Iraq
Rowers at the 2016 Summer Olympics
Rowers at the 2020 Summer Olympics
Rowers at the 2014 Asian Games
Rowers at the 2018 Asian Games
Asian Games competitors for Iraq